Bourgogne-Fresne is a commune in the department of Marne, northeastern France. The municipality was established on 1 January 2017 by merger of the former communes of Bourgogne (the seat) and Fresne-lès-Reims.

See also 
Communes of the Marne department

References 

Communes of Marne (department)